Ajuga japonica is a herbaceous flowering plant native to Japan. The species grows as a groundcover on the forest floor, usually near streams. It is often found in large clusters, due to its spreading and seeding habit. It grows along the ground by stolons, and is usually 8–20 cm (3–8 in) high, including the flowers. It flowers between late April and late May.

Description
These flowers grow from the tips of the flower stems. They are situated opposite on the stem.

References

japonica
Flora of Asia
Flora of Japan
Garden plants of Asia
Groundcovers
Taxa named by Friedrich Anton Wilhelm Miquel
Plants described in 1865